John Barnewall may refer to:

John Barnewall, 3rd Baron Trimlestown (died 1538), Irish nobleman, judge and politician
John Barnewall (Franciscan friar) (c. 1595–c. 1650), Irish Franciscan friar and scholar
Sir John Robert Barnewall, 11th Baronet (1850–1936), of the Barnewall baronets
John Barnewall (recorder) (c. 1635–c. 1705), Irish landowner, barrister, judge and Recorder of Dublin
 John Thomas Barnewall, 15th Baron Trimlestown (1773–1839), Irish landowner